Efraín Gutiérrez (born May 1, 1946) is a Chicano film director known for making films that emphasize the ethical difficulties and socioeconomic struggles that the Chicano working class community faces. Gutiérrez is regarded as the first Mexican-American to produce a movie independently with Please Don't Bury Me Alive!, released in 1976 which he also starred in as the lead role. Gutiérrez has also directed seven other movies including Amor Chicano Es Para Siempre and Run Tecato Run. Several of his films have been archived by UCLA.

Early life 
Gutiérrez was born in San Antonio, Texas on May 1, 1946, to his mother, Manuela Alvizo from New Braunfels, and his father, Efrain-Abran Gutiérrez who was born In Guanajuato. He was the youngest of 7 siblings. They lived on the west side of San Antonio, one of the poorest neighborhoods in the city of San Antonio. From the time he was two years old up until he was 15, Gutiérrez and his family traveled from San Antonio to the Midwest working as migrant farmworkers.

During the time that his family was traveling for work Gutiérrez was unable to attend school so his mother would teach him and his siblings how to read and write in Spanish. After many years of traveling with his family for work Gutiérrez returned to school where he would learn English as well as how to read and write in English. Throughout his years of school Gutiérrez struggled and would get into some trouble which ultimately resulted in him dropping out twice until eventually in 1966 at the age of twenty Gutiérrez would finally graduate High School making him the first person in his family to receive a high school diploma.

After graduation Gutiérrez was unsure about what career path he wanted to take. He initially looked into the military but quickly realized that was not he wanted to do. He then went and enrolled at St. Phillips University and shortly after was drafted to the Vietnam war which would ultimately make his decision to attend school at St. Philips to avoid the Vietnam war. He would eventually leave St. Philips and moved to Los Angeles and enrolled at East Los Angeles College where he took a theatre arts class which ultimately sparked his interest in acting.

Career 
While at ELAC he met some classmates that lead to him meeting Carlos Alvarado who was a notable Chicano acting agent and would eventually go on to be Gutiérrez's first agent. Alvarado would eventually land him his first big audition for John Wayne's last movie "The Cowboy" where he would go onto get called back multiple times but would ultimately not land the role. Gutiérrez would later connect with Emilio Gonzales who was on the famous children's show sesame street at the time who invited him to join a Mexican-American theatre group. After being a part of that group briefly he would finally make the decision to move back to his hometown of San Antonio Texas and star his own theatre group. While performing in plays with different theatre groups is where he developed interest in filmmaking and began to introduce the idea to make a film to a few of his colleagues. Gutiérrez would go on to meet Emilio Carbadillo who would become a play-writing mentor for him.

Please, Don't Bury Me Alive! 
Please, Don't Bury Me Alive! was filmed in San Antonio. It takes place in the spring of 1972 and follows the story of a young Chicano male named Alejandro who is dealing with the loss of his brother as well as trying to make ends meet for himself coming from an area riddled with poverty. Alejandro eventually finds himself falling into a life of crime and is eventually setup by an undercover police offer on a drug deal, receiving a 10-year sentence while a young white male is convicted of a similar sentence is given probation. This film aims to depict the social injustice in the judicial system that minorities face.

After producing the film on a minimal budget, Gutiérrez was finally able to screen the film. The turnout for the first screening ended up being successful and generated a gross income of $20,000 the first week and a total of $40,000 for the first three weeks of showing. These numbers quickly gained the attention of other theaters and was ultimately able to gross a total of over $300,000 in its first four months of showing.

In 2014, Gutiérrez was planning on constructing a Chicano arts center in San Antonio.

References 

1946 births
Filmmakers from Texas
People from San Antonio
Film directors from Texas
Actors from Texas
Living people